The Irania Encyclopedia (Persian: فرهنگنامه ایران Farhangnameh Iran) is a reference book for the culture and civilization of the Persian and Iranian Plateau. The encyclopedia has 5,000 entries and 500 photos, and it was written by Reza Moradi Ghiasabadi.

References

External links
Irania Encyclopedia (Persian) 
Agah Publisher (Persian)

2013 non-fiction books
21st-century encyclopedias
Iranian books
Iranian culture
Persian encyclopedias